Sitotroga pseudopsacasta is a moth of the family Gelechiidae. It was described by Ponomarenko and Park in 2007. It is found in Korea.

References

Moths described in 2007
Sitotroga